Benalto is a hamlet in central Alberta, Canada within Red Deer County. Benalto is also recognized by Statistics Canada as a designated place.

Kountry Meadows, a manufactured home community and designated place recognized by Statistics Canada, is immediately adjacent to the Hamlet of Benalto.  Although it forms part of the community, the hamlet's boundaries do not include the manufactured home park at this time.

Demographics 

See also 
List of communities in Alberta
List of designated places in Alberta
List of hamlets in Alberta

References 

Hamlets in Alberta
Designated places in Alberta
Red Deer County